Xylotoles laetus is a species of beetle in the family Cerambycidae. It was described by White in 1846. It is known from New Zealand.

References

Dorcadiini
Beetles described in 1846